Nyunggai Warren Stephen Mundine  is an Australian Aboriginal person and politician. He was the national president of the Australian Labor Party (ALP), but quit the party in 2012. Mundine was appointed chairman of the Coalition government's Indigenous Advisory Council by then-prime minister, Tony Abbott. 

Mundine was the Liberal Party's unsuccessful candidate for the marginal seat of Gilmore on the south coast of New South Wales in the 2019 Australian federal election.

Early life and education
Mundine was born in Grafton, New South Wales.

A member of the Bundjalung people, the traditional owners of much of coastal northern New South Wales, Mundine was the ninth of eleven children of a family consisting of eight boys and three girls.  Through his mother, he is also a descendant of the Gumbaynggirr, Yuin, and Irish peoples. He is the cousin of boxer Tony Mundine and a second cousin of Anthony Mundine, the boxer and footballer.

In 1963, his family settled in the western Sydney suburb of Auburn. Mundine went to the Catholic Benedict Marist Brothers College, and was a fitter and turner after leaving school. Mundine worked as a barman at night and as an office trolley boy during the day, and later attended night college to earn his Higher School Certificate. 

Following a job at the Australian Taxation Office, Mundine moved to Adelaide, studying at the South Australian Institute of Technology, which later became the University of South Australia.

Early career
After graduation, Mundine worked in the New South Wales public service, including a stint as the CEO of the New South Wales Native Title Service.

Political career
In 1995, Mundine began his foray into politics as an independent candidate for the City of Dubbo council in central-west New South Wales. He was the first Aboriginal person to serve on the body, and later became deputy mayor of Dubbo.

ALP career 
At the 1999 state election, Mundine stood as the NSW Labor candidate for the seat of Dubbo. At the 2001 federal election, Mundine was placed third on the Labor  Senate ticket for NSW. In 2004, he sought to stand as the ALP candidate for the Division of Fowler in the House of Representatives, but lost the preselection battle to sitting Labor MP, Julia Irwin.

Mundine succeeded Barry Jones as President of the ALP, beginning his term on 28 January 2006, and became the first indigenous Australian to serve as president of an Australian political party. During his tenure, Mundine pushed for the selection of candidates of Aboriginal background. Mundine served just one term as national president, stepping down in 2007. In March 2012, he expressed an interest in becoming Labor's first federal Aboriginal member of federal parliament, following the resignation of Mark Arbib from the Senate.

After the selection of former Premier of New South Wales Bob Carr to replace Arbib, Mundine left the Labor Party. In an interview with The Australian, Mundine explained that he had been a supporter of "Hawke-Keating Labor, which was about economic development and progress, and working with unions to get good outcomes for everyone", but that, by 2012, the ALP was "no longer the party I joined" and had failed to keep up with the conservative parties in selecting indigenous candidates.

Liberal Party career 
Following the election of the Tony Abbott-led Liberal-National coalition in 2013, Abbott appointed Mundine as chairman of the Australian government's Indigenous Advisory Council. In January 2017, Mundine lost his position when the council was dissolved by the prime minister, Malcolm Turnbull.

On 22 January 2019, at the behest of the prime minister, Scott Morrison, the New South Wales state executive of the Liberal Party installed Mundine as candidate for the seat of Gilmore in the 2019 federal election, although he had only joined the party that week. The state executive waived the usual waiting period for new party members, and withdrew the endorsement of Grant Schultz, who had been preselected as the party's candidate eight months previously. Mundine failed to be elected, and Gilmore was the only seat won by the Labor Party at the election.

Supporter of nuclear power 

In the late 2000s, Mundine emerged as a public supporter of nuclear industrial development in Australia, arguing that, in response to climate change, nuclear power should not be ruled out of Australia's future energy mix. His former directorship of the Australian Uranium Association attracted criticism from anti-nuclear lobbies. Following the Fukushima nuclear disaster in March 2011, The Sydney Morning Herald named Mundine as a supporter of nuclear power.

Mundine wrote in an opinion piece published in The Australian Financial Review in 2012:"By looking after the full life cycle of the uranium, with the support of the traditional owners of the lands on which it is mined and stored, not only will we play a responsible role within the global community, but we can ensure that Australian uranium is not sold to states seeking to produce weapons."

Other roles
Mundine maintained his interest in Indigenous advocacy in his role with Andrew Forrest's Pilbara Mining indigenous charity Generation One. 

From 12 December 2017, Mundine co-hosted a 12-part program on Sky News Live, Mundine Means Business,   focusing on successful indigenous Australians in business. A second season debuted on 2 September 2018, supported by a grant totalling $220,000 from the Coalition government, running from 18 June 2018 to 1 August 2019, supporting 15 percent of the season's production expenses. Mundine received legal advice that the grant would not preclude him from being a candidate for the next federal election under Section 44 of the Constitution of Australia.

Other roles have included:
Chair of the Australian Indigenous Education Foundation (as of June 2022)

Co-founder (2008) and chair of the now apparently defunct Australian Indigenous Chamber of Commerce, later incorporating the Yaabubiin Institute for Disruptive Thinking

Recognition and honours
2016: Officer of the Order of Australia 
2005: Bennelong Medal for service to the Aboriginal community

Personal life
In 1975, Mundine married his first wife, Jenny Rose, with whom he has two children. After separating from Rose, Mundine gained custody of their two children. 

In 1983, he met his second wife Lynette Riley, marrying her in 1984. They raised seven children: two from Mundine's first marriage, four of their own, and a foster child. They initially married at St Andrew's Congregational Church in Balmain, and in 2003 renewed their vows at St Brigid's Catholic Church in Dubbo. A devout Catholic, Mundine told The Catholic Weekly that he prayed every night. His marriage to Riley broke down during his presidency of the ALP, after he cheated on his wife more than once. Riley, a lecturer in Aboriginal education at Sydney University, remained largely silent about the disintegration of her marriage with Mundine but, in 2013 she gave a rare interview on the subject.

In October 2013, Mundine married for a third time, describing it as the beginning of "a new life". His third wife, Elizabeth Henderson, is the child of Anne and Gerard Henderson, directors of The Sydney Institute.

References

Further reading

"Labor's great black hope", The Australian, December 2005

External links
 VIDEO Warren Mundine and Marcia Langton talk about the need for a new dialogue on Indigenous Affairs on ABC FORA

1956 births
Living people
Indigenous Australian politicians
Bundjalung people
Officers of the Order of Australia
Australian Labor Party officials
Australian Roman Catholics
New South Wales local councillors
Deputy mayors of places in Australia
Politicians from Sydney
Australian people of Irish descent